Manton Dam is a small concrete arch dam on the Manton River, approximately  south of Darwin, Northern Territory in Australia. The dam was originally constructed by the Department of Defence during the Second World War to provide a reliable supply of fresh  water to Darwin, completed in 1942. The reservoir itself is now mostly used for recreation, such as fishing, boating and water skiing, surrounded by a conservation area for native flora and fauna.

Current status
The much larger Darwin River Dam was commissioned in 1972, with Manton Dam retained for emergency supply. Since then, the Power and Water Corporation has maintained the dam and infrastructure in an inactive state. Since 1989, the Manton Dam Recreation Area has been open to the public within the portfolio of Northern Territory Parks and Wildlife. Although camping and swimming are not permitted, it is a popular venue for recreational water sports. The reservoir is divided into three distinct zones, allowing separation between high speed watercraft like jet skis, an area for towing skiers and an area for kayaks, canoes, and sailing. The lake is also stocked with various fish species, with fishing permitted in all zones. The environment around the dam is an excellent habitat for crocodiles, which Parks and Wildlife regularly patrol and survey to trap and remove many of these animals, especially during the wet season.

In February 2014, an experimental hydroelectric generator was installed by the Power and Water Corporation in partnership with Charles Darwin University's Centre for Renewable Energy. Outputting roughly 4kW, the small generator is connected to the mains power grid to take advantage of seasonal releases and spillages during the wet season, and is the first of its kind in the Territory.

Future re-use
In 2019, it was estimated that associated works would cost $122 million. A 2018 report prepared by the CSIRO included a detailed investigation of potential dam sites to meet the future needs of the region. This report found that while Manton Dam could provide a short-term solution until a much larger storage can be created, there are some concerns over water quality.

See also
 List of dams and reservoirs in Australia

References

Dams in the Northern Territory
Dams completed in 1942
1942 establishments in Australia
Darwin, Northern Territory